Jabez Wolffe (19 November 1876 - 22 October 1943) attempted to swim the English Channel from 1906 to 1914 in 21 attempts.

Biography
Born in Glasgow, Scotland, on 19 November 1876 as Jacob Abraham Wolffe, he was generally known by the first name Jabez. He occasionally published as "Jappy Wolffe"

English Channel cross attempts
Among one of his attempts to cross the channel was in August 1907, when he made his swim with Ted Heaton and their efforts gradually turning into "something of a race". While Heaton on that occasion failed, Wolffe came "within three quarters of a mile" from the coast when the wind turned and drove him away from the shore.

The closest attempt was in 1908, which failed by yards. Three other occasions were by under a mile.

Swimming Trainer - controversy
Gertrude Ederle was an American swimming champion, Olympic champion and record breaker who trained with Wolffe for her first attempt to cross the English Channel to France.

Training with Wolffe did not go well as he continually tried to slow her pace, saying that she would never last at that speed. Then, in her first attempt at the Channel on August 18, 1925, she was disqualified when he ordered another swimmer (who was keeping her company in the water), Ishak Helmy, to recover her from the water. According to both Ederle and other witnesses, she was not "drowning" but resting, floating face-down. She bitterly disagreed with his decision. As he had commented that women may not be capable of swimming the Channel it was speculated that he did not want Ederle to succeed.

Ederle successfully crossed the Channel one year later, from Cape Gris-Nez in France to Kingsdown, Kent, 14 hours and 34 minutes later. She was trained by coach Bill Burgess.

Publications
Text-Book of Swimming (1907)
Swimming Short & Long Distance (1926)

References

English Channel swimmers
1943 deaths
1876 births